Christina Scheppelmann is a German arts administrator. Scheppelmann is the general director of the Seattle Opera. She is one of the major female opera administrations in the United States, along with Francesca Zambello of the Washington National Opera, Khori Dastoor of Houston Grand Opera, Deborah Sandler of Lyric Opera of Kansas City, Annie Burridge of Austin Opera, and Sue Dixon of Portland Opera.

Scheppelmann earned her degree in banking in Germany. In 1988, she began working in artist management in Milan, Italy. In 1994, she worked for the San Francisco Opera, over seeing the season design and staffing. Scheppelmann was director of artistic operations at the Washington National Opera for 11 years, a position in which she collaborated with then general director Plácido Domingo. She was the first general director at the Royal Opera House Muscat. In August 2019, Scheppelmann left the Gran Teatre del Liceu in Barcelona, Spain to serve as general director of the Seattle Opera.

In 2019, Scheppelmann released a statement about the sexual harassment allegations against Plácido Domingo. She stated that if an employee would have told her about Domingo's alleged behavior, Scheppelmann would have confronted Domingo, which she had done regarding sexual harassment situations at the San Francisco Opera. Scheppelmann also stated that she is a victim of harassment.

References

Opera in the United States
Women arts administrators
German people in arts occupations
German opera directors
Female opera directors
Living people
Year of birth missing (living people)